Joseph John Novsek (born May 29, 1939) is a former American football defensive lineman who played one season in the American Football League (AFL) for the Oakland Raiders. He played college football for Tulsa.

Early life and education
Joe Novsek was born on May 29, 1939, in Cardale, Pennsylvania. He attended Redstone High School near there, graduating in c. 1958. After his high school career, Novsek accepted a scholarship offer from The University of Tulsa in Oklahoma. Upon joining the school, he immediately made the team roster. As a sophomore in 1959, he was named second-team all-conference at the tackle position. He was named co-team captain to start his junior year. As a senior in 1961, he was named first-team all-conference by Associated Press.

Professional career
Novsek was selected in both the 1961 NFL Draft (by Baltimore Colts, 19th round, 259th overall) and 1961 AFL Draft (by Oakland Raiders, 17th round, 131st overall), but chose to finish his collegiate career. At the end of the 1961 college football season, Novsek chose the Raiders in the AFL over the NFL's Colts. He was used by the Raiders on each position of the defensive line, and appeared in all fourteen games of the 1962 season. He was a starter in two of their games. He was named to the AFL's All-Rookie team at the end of the season. He was released at roster cuts in August 1963. Novsek was released at the 1964 roster cuts, ending his professional career.

References

1939 births
Living people
Players of American football from Pennsylvania
American football defensive linemen
Tulsa Golden Hurricane football players
Oakland Raiders players
Baltimore Colts players